Seán Ó Cuilleanáin (John Cullinane) was an Irish scribe and translator.

A native of Cummer, County Galway, Ó Cuilleanáin transcribed Fenian Cycle lore and songs in English.

References
Scríobhaithe Lámhscríbhinní Gaeilge I nGaillimh 1700-1900, William Mahon, in "Galway: History and Society", 1996

Irish scribes
People from County Galway
19th-century Irish people